The 2014 United States House of Representatives elections in Nevada were held on Tuesday, November 4, 2014 to elect the four U.S. representatives from the state of Nevada, one from each of the state's four congressional districts. The elections coincided with the elections of other federal and state offices, including a gubernatorial election. As of 2021, this is the last time the Republicans won a majority of House districts in Nevada, as well as the last time Nevada's 2nd congressional district was won with over 60% of the vote.

Overview

By district
Results of the 2014 United States House of Representatives elections in Nevada by district:

District 1

Nevada's 1st congressional district occupies most of Nevada's largest city, Las Vegas, as well as parts of North Las Vegas and parts of unincorporated Clark County. The district is now staunchly Democratic. The incumbent is Democrat Dina Titus, who has represented the 1st district since January 2013 and easily won her bid for re-election on November 4, 2014.

Democratic primary

Candidates
 Herbert Glenn Peters
 Dina Titus, incumbent U.S. Representative

Results

Republican primary

Candidates
 Jose Padilla
 Annette Teijeiro

Results

General election

Results

District 2

Nevada's 2nd congressional district includes the northern third of the state. It includes most of Douglas and Lyon counties, all of Churchill, Elko, Eureka, Humboldt, Pershing and Washoe counties, as well as the state capital, Carson City. The largest city in the district is Reno, the state's third largest city. Although the district appears rural, its politics are dominated by Reno and Carson City, which combined cast over 85 percent of the district's vote. The incumbent is Republican Mark Amodei, who has represented the 2nd district since September 2011 following a special election upon the appointment of Dean Heller to the Senate.

Republican primary
 Mark Amodei, incumbent U.S. Representative

Democratic primary

Candidates
 Vance Alm
 Brian Dempsey
 Ed Lee
 Kristen Spees

Results

General election

Results

District 3

The 3rd Congressional District occupies the area south of Las Vegas, including Henderson, and most of unincorporated Clark County.  The district was initially created after the 2000 census. The incumbent is Republican Joe Heck, who has represented the 3rd district since January 2011.

Republican primary
 Joe Heck, incumbent U.S. Representative

Democratic primary
Erin Bilbray, a Democratic National Committeewoman and founder of Emerge Nevada, sought the Democratic nomination to challenge Heck. The Democratic Congressional Campaign Committee invited Bilbray to the second inauguration of Barack Obama, where she met with party figures. Erin Bilbray is the daughter of James Bilbray, who represented Nevada's 1st Congressional District from 1987 to 1995 and served in the Nevada State Senate from 1980 to 1986. Frank Kassela, a professional poker player, briefly ran for the Democratic nomination before dropping out and endorsing Bilbray.

Candidates
 Erin Bilbray, Democratic National Committeewoman
 Zachary "Mr. Z" Campbell

Results

General election

Results

District 4

The 4th Congressional District is a new district that was created as a result of the 2010 Census.

Located in the central portion of the state, it includes most of northern Clark County, parts of Douglas and Lyon counties, and all of Esmeralda, Lincoln, Mineral, Nye and White Pine counties. More than four-fifths of the district's population lives in Clark County. The incumbent is Democrat Steven Horsford, who has represented the 4th district since January 2013; he was defeated on November 4, 2014 in his bid for re-election by Cresent Hardy.

Democratic primary

Candidates
 Mark J. Budetich
 Steven Horsford, incumbent U.S. Representative
 Sid Zeller

Results

Republican primary

Candidates
 Cresent Hardy, Assistant Minority Leader of the Nevada Assembly
 Niger Innis, spokesman for the Congress of Racial Equality
 Michael Ace Monroe
 Carlo "Mazunga" Poliak

Results

General election

Results

See also
 2014 United States House of Representatives elections
 2014 United States elections

References

External links
U.S. House elections in Nevada, 2014 at Ballotpedia
Campaign contributions at OpenSecrets

Nevada
2014
United States House of Representatives